The Airbet Girabet is a family of Spanish autogyros, designed and produced by Airbet of Barcelona.  They are all supplied as complete ready-to-fly-aircraft.

Design and development
The Girabet family of designs all feature a single main rotor, tricycle landing gear and Rotax two-stroke and four-stroke engines mounted in pusher configuration. The aircraft fuselage is made from curved steel and aluminum tubing and mounts a cruciform tail. All rotor blades and other dynamic components are built by the company in-house. All models fit pre-rotators to shorten take-off distances.

Variants

Girabet Classic
Original single seat model, powered by a  Rotax 503 twin cylinder, air-cooled, two-stroke, dual-ignition powerplant. The company also offers a custom-built trailer for ground transportation and home storage.
Girabet 582
More powerful single seat model, powered by a  Rotax 582 twin cylinder, liquid-cooled, two-stroke, dual-ignition powerplant.
Girabet 2
Side-by-side configuration two seat model intended for use as a trainer, powered by a  Rotax 912S four cylinder, air and liquid-cooled, four-stroke, dual-ignition powerplant.
Girabet 2 Sport
Side-by-side configuration two seat model intended for use as a cross country aircraft and equipped with a cockpit fairing and windshield.

Specifications (Girabet 582)

References

External links

1990s Spanish sport aircraft
Homebuilt aircraft
Single-engined pusher autogyros